Eulychius is a genus of leaf beetles in the subfamily Eumolpinae. They are found in Madagascar.

Species
Subgenus Eulychius Jacoby, 1882
 Eulychius madagascariensis Jacoby, 1882
 Eulychius subviolaceus Weise, 1910
Subgenus Eulychioides Bechyné, 1947 (type species: Eulychius nigritarsis Jacoby, 1892)
 Eulychius dentipes Bechyné, 1947
 Eulychius nigritarsis Jacoby, 1892
 Eulychius sulcatus Bechyné, 1947

References

Eumolpinae
Chrysomelidae genera
Beetles of Africa
Insects of Madagascar
Taxa named by Martin Jacoby
Endemic fauna of Madagascar